Thomas Aupic (born 24 February 1985) is a French professional footballer who plays as a goalkeeper for the club Paris FC in the French Ligue 2.

Professional career
After a successful start to his footballing career with SR Colmar in the Championnat National, Aupic suffered years of injuries and setbacks including a fibula-tibia double fracture. After nearly giving up football in and taking a part-time teaching job, Aupic joined Paris FC in June 2016. He made his professional debut at the age of 32 for Paris FC in a 2–0 Coupe de la Ligue loss to Clermont Foot on 22 August 2017.

Personal life
Aupic is of Moroccan descent.

References

External links
 
 

1985 births
Living people
French sportspeople of Moroccan descent
Sportspeople from Dijon
Association football goalkeepers
French footballers
RC Strasbourg Alsace players
FC Dieppe players
Jura Sud Foot players
Paris FC players
US Ivry players
FC Chambly Oise players
Ligue 2 players
Championnat National players
Championnat National 2 players
Championnat National 3 players
Footballers from Bourgogne-Franche-Comté